Rhodopirellula bahusiensis is a bacterium from the genus of Rhodopirellula.

References

Bacteria described in 2011
Planctomycetota